Marianne Buggenhagen (born 26 May 1953 in Ueckermünde, East Germany) is a Paralympian athlete from Germany competing mainly in throwing events.

Career history
She first competed in the 1992 Summer Paralympics in Barcelona, Spain. There she won four gold medals in discus, javelin, shot put and pentathlon. Then at the 1996 Summer Paralympics in Atlanta, United States she again won the shot and discus and won a bronze in the javelin. The following games in 2000 in Sydney, Australia she yet again won the shot put. At her fourth games in 2004 she won her fourth consecutive shot put title and won a silver in the discus throw. Marianne was one of the few athletes to have competed in Barcelona to also compete in the 2008 Summer Paralympics in Beijing, there she failed to win a fifth shot put managing only to win the bronze medal, but did manage to win the discus throw, her twelfth medal in all of which 9 had been gold.

Honours

There are two schools with her name. One in Buch, the other one in Darlingerode, near "Haus Oehrenfeld".

Notes

External links
 
 

1953 births
Living people
German female discus throwers
German female javelin throwers
German female shot putters
Wheelchair discus throwers
Wheelchair javelin throwers
Wheelchair shot putters
Paralympic discus throwers
Paralympic javelin throwers
Paralympic shot putters
Paralympic athletes of Germany
Paralympic medalists in athletics (track and field)
Paralympic gold medalists for Germany
Paralympic silver medalists for Germany
Paralympic bronze medalists for Germany
World record holders in Paralympic athletics
Athletes (track and field) at the 1992 Summer Paralympics
Athletes (track and field) at the 1996 Summer Paralympics
Athletes (track and field) at the 2000 Summer Paralympics
Athletes (track and field) at the 2004 Summer Paralympics
Athletes (track and field) at the 2008 Summer Paralympics
Athletes (track and field) at the 2012 Summer Paralympics
Athletes (track and field) at the 2016 Summer Paralympics
Medalists at the 1992 Summer Paralympics
Medalists at the 1996 Summer Paralympics
Medalists at the 2000 Summer Paralympics
Medalists at the 2004 Summer Paralympics
Medalists at the 2008 Summer Paralympics
Medalists at the 2012 Summer Paralympics
Medalists at the 2016 Summer Paralympics
Recipients of the Silver Laurel Leaf
Recipients of the Cross of the Order of Merit of the Federal Republic of Germany
Recipients of the Order of Merit of Berlin
People from Ueckermünde
People from Bezirk Neubrandenburg
Sportspeople from Mecklenburg-Western Pomerania